Ratajczyk is a Polish surname. Notable people with the surname include:

 Adam Ratajczyk (born 2002), Polish footballer
 Krzysztof Ratajczyk (born 1973), Polish footballer
 Rafał Ratajczyk (born 1983), Polish cyclist
 Petrus Thomas Ratajczyk (born 1962, died 2010), a.k.a. Peter Steele, singer and bassguitar player of Type O Negative

See also
 Ratajczak

Polish-language surnames